Cheadle Bulkeley was a township in the ancient parish of Cheadle, now in Greater Manchester, England.  It lay in the historic county of Cheshire.

Geography
Cheadle Bulkeley covered part of the rural area that formed modern-day Cheadle and Cheadle Hulme.

The 1846 tithe map shows that Cheadle Bulkeley was intertwined with Cheadle Moseley township, an unusual situation in Cheshire. The 1870s Ordnance Survey map shows that the townships each had many detached portions, several enclosed within the other. (Cheadle Moseley had 8 detached portions, and Cheadle Bulkeley had 35 detached portions.)

Together, the two townships were bordered to the west by Stockport Etchells, to the north by Heaton Norris, to the east by Bramhall and Stockport and to the south by Handforth.

History
Cheadle Bulkeley existed as a township from the Middle Ages until 1879, when it was merged with the township of Cheadle Moseley to form Cheadle Civil Parish.

In 1894, Cheadle and Stockport Etchells Civil Parishes merged to form the Cheadle and Gatley Urban District, finally becoming part of the Metropolitan Borough of Stockport in 1974.

References

History of Cheshire
Geography of the Metropolitan Borough of Stockport
Cheadle, Greater Manchester